is a Japanese suit actor who played Kamen Rider Kuuga in all his forms, in Kamen Rider Kuuga. He returned to do suit work for the A.R. World Kuuga in episodes 25 and 26 of Kamen Rider Decade and in Kamen Rider Decade: All Riders vs. Dai-Shocker.

He also played an angry instructor in episode 21 of Kamen Rider W. He once again served as suit actor for Kamen Rider Kuuga in Kamen Rider × Super Sentai: Super Hero Taisen.

Stunt/suit actor roles

Kamen Rider Series
 Kamen Rider Kuuga (2000-2001) - Kamen Rider Kuuga
 Kamen Rider Decade (2009) - Kamen Rider Kuuga
 Kamen Rider Decade: All Riders vs. Dai-Shocker (2009) - Kamen Rider Kuuga
 Kamen Rider × Super Sentai: Super Hero Taisen (2012) - Kamen Rider Kuuga
 Kamen Rider Gaim (2013-2014) - Kamen Rider Duke
 Kamen Rider × Kamen Rider Gaim & Wizard: The Fateful Sengoku Movie Battle (2013) - Kamen Rider Bujin Gaim, Ogre
 Heisei Riders vs. Shōwa Riders: Kamen Rider Taisen feat. Super Sentai (2014) - Kamen Rider Fifteen

Non-suit actor roles
 Kamen Rider W (2009-2010) - angry instructor (Episode 21)
 Heisei Riders vs. Shōwa Riders: Kamen Rider Taisen feat. Super Sentai (2014)

References 
 https://web.archive.org/web/20160304042304/http://www.kamen-rider.com/cast/pfl-kenjitominaga.htm

1970 births
Living people
Japanese male film actors